Miss Great Britain is Britain's longest running beauty contest held annually in Britain since 1945. Owner and CEO John Singh made history crowning his first winner and to this date only the first black Miss Great Britain 1996. Singer and dancer Anita St Rose took the Miss Great Britain crown.

History
Following World War Two, a number of seaside resorts around the United Kingdom introduced beauty contests. The first, held in Morecambe in 1945, went on to become Miss Great Britain.

The contest began in the Summer of 1945 under the name “Bathing Beauty Queen”, organised by the Morecambe Town Council in partnership with the ‘Sunday Dispatch’ newspaper. Morecambe went on to become the home of Miss Great Britain between 1956 and 1989.

The first ever Miss Great Britain final was watched by 4,300 people in a continuous downpour. The winner received a cup and according to the local newspaper ‘a paltry prize’ of seven guineas as well as a swimsuit. Prize money increased to £100 the following year, £500 the next and reached £1000 in the fifties due to its popularity. The contest continued to offer the largest prize fund of any competition run by a municipal authority.

Heats of Miss Great Britain took place in Mecca dance halls. Between 1951 and 1957 the winner of Miss Great Britain qualified for entry in the Miss World contest.

The sixties saw the beginning of the decline in British seaside holidays with families increasingly able to afford trips abroad. A new competition format was needed and was realised with the introduction of television to Miss Great Britain in 1971, a Yorkshire Television production for ITV that drew an audience of millions. By 1978, the prize fund had increased to £10,000 thanks to the competition's sponsors, and the popularity of the competition was again on the rise.

In 1981 the television rights were bought by the BBC. In 1984, the controller of BBC1 Michael Grade, announced that the 1985 contest would be the last televised on the BBC. Grade stated that the contest "no longer merits national air time. They are an anachronism in this day and age of equality and verging on the offensive." Jill Saxby, who later married the snooker star Willie Thorne therefore became the last Miss Great Britain to be crowned on television in 1985.

Morecambe Town Council put the contest up for sale following the 1989 final and there were no contests held for a number of years.

Notable Miss Great Britain Contestants 
Notable contestants in the Miss Great Britain contest have included:
 Anne Heywood, a film actor during the 1950s–80s, won the title in 1950 under her real name of Violet Pretty.
 Leila Williams, a presenter of the children's television programme Blue Peter between 1958 and 1962, won the title in 1957.
 Marti Caine, a comedian, competed in 1961.
 Nina Carter, a future Page 3 girl, appeared in the 1971 final.
 Debbie Greenwood, who later became a breakfast television presenter, won the title in 1984.
Danielle Lloyd
Sophie Gradon
Zara Holland
Preeti Desai

2006 event 
The 2006 title holder was Preeti Desai from North Yorkshire who made history as the first winner of Indian ethnicity. She had come fifth in the pageant but was selected by a poll of newspaper readers to replace the original winner Danielle Lloyd, who had been stripped of the title following a scandal. Lloyd's title was restored to her some years later and she is included in the contest's list of previous winners.

2007 event 
Rachael Tennent, a project co-ordinator, was awarded the crown of Miss Great Britain. Along with the crown, the new titleholder was gifted a car, jewellery and a modelling contract. Tennent had previously competed for the Miss Scotland 2006 title which she placed 2nd runner-up. The event was held in Grosvenor House in Park Lane, London. Tennent did not complete her reign which resulted in Gemma Garrett (Miss Great Britain 1st Runner Up 2007) taking over the title of Miss Great Britain for the rest of the year.

2009 event 
The event took place on 12 May 2009 at the Café de Paris in Central London. A strong PR campaign was orchestrated to re-brand the event to the nation, with some 70,000 online entrants being whittled down through national heats to the final 12 girls. Heavily covered by the media, the eventual winner was Miss Newcastle - Sophie Gradon who won Miss Great Britain at the age of 23 years old.

Title holders

Archives
Archives of Miss Great Britain are held at The Women's Library at the Library of the London School of Economics. Most surviving material is held at Lancashire Archives as part of the Morecambe and Heysham Borough Council collection.

References

Beauty pageants in the United Kingdom
British awards
Recurring events established in 1945
Women in the United Kingdom

External links
 Official website